is a Japanese actor. He is the son of veteran Japanese actor Rentarō Mikuni.

Career
Sato has appeared in some of Junji Sakamoto's films such as Tokarev, Face, KT, Children of the Dark, and Human Trust.

He also appeared in Takashi Miike's Sukiyaki Western Django, Yoichi Sai's Kamui Gaiden, and Takahisa Zeze's Heaven's Story.

Filmography

Film

Television

Awards and nominations

Awards won
1982: 24th Blue Ribbon Awards: Best New Actor for The Gate of Youth
1982: 5th Japan Academy Prize: Newcomer of the Year for The Gate of Youth
1984: 8th Elan d'or Awards: Newcomer of the Year
1995: 18th Japan Academy Prize: Best Actor for Crest of Betrayal
1995: 7th Nikkan Sports Film Award: Best Actor for Crest of Betrayal
1995: 16th Yokohama Film Festival: Best Supporting Actor for Tokarev
1996: 10th Takasaki Film Festival: Best Actor for Gonin
2001: 24th Japan Academy Prize: Best Supporting Actor for Whiteout
2001: 15th Takasaki Film Festival: Best Supporting Actor for Face
2003: 12th Japanese Movie Critics Awards: Best Actor for KT
2003: 45th Blue Ribbon Awards: Best Actor for KT
2004: 27th Japan Academy Prize: Best Supporting Actor for When the Last Sword Is Drawn
2006: 32nd Hoso Bunka Foundation Award: Performance Award for Climber's High
2007: 61st Mainichi Film Awards: Best Actor for What the Snow Brings
2007: 18th Tokyo International Film Festival: Best Actor Award for What the Snow Brings
2007: 61st Japan Broadcast Film and Arts Awards: Excellence Award What the Snow Brings
2008: 1st International Drama Festival in Tokyo: Best Actor for Kaze no Hate, Tengoku to Jigoku, and Honto to Uso to Tequila
2009: 63rd Japan Broadcast Film and Arts Awards: Best Actor Award for Honto to Uso to Tequila
2012: 73rd Television Drama Academy Awards: Best Supporting Actor for Kagi no Kakatta Heya
2012: 16th Nikkan Sports Drama Grand Prix (Spring 2012): Best Supporting Actor for Kagi no Kakatta Heya
2015: 40th Hochi Film Award: Best Actor for Kishūteneki Terminal and The Pearls of the Stone Man
2016: 29th Nikkan Sports Film Award: Best Actor for 64: Part I and 64: Part II
2017: 40th Japan Academy Prize: Best Actor for 64: Part I
2018: 5th Kyoto International Art and Film Festival: Toshiro Mifune Award

Awards nominated
1984: 7th Japan Academy Prize: Best Supporting Actor for The Catch
2007: 30th Japan Academy Prize: Best Supporting Actor for The Uchoten Hotel
2007: 61st Japan Broadcast Film and Arts Awards: Best Actor for Honto to Uso to Tequila
2009: 32nd Japan Academy Prize: Best Supporting Actor for The Magic Hour
2012: 35th Japan Academy Prize: Best Supporting Actor for The Last Ronin
2013: 36th Japan Academy Prize: Best Supporting Actor for Anata e
2013: 36th Japan Academy Prize: Best Supporting Actor for The Floating Castle
2016: 39th Japan Academy Prize: Best Actor for Kishūteneki Terminal

References

External links

1960 births
20th-century Japanese male actors
21st-century Japanese male actors
Japanese male film actors
Japanese male television actors
Living people
Male actors from Tokyo